Kevin Cameron may refer to:

 Kevin Cameron (baseball) (born 1979), American baseball pitcher
 Kevin Cameron (politician) (born 1958), Oregon county commissioner and former state representative
 Kevin Cameron (journalist), motorcycle journalist and technical editor for Cycle World magazine
 Kevin Cameron, guitarist of Australian metalcore bands I Killed the Prom Queen and In Trenches